Kate Walby (née Webster) is a broadcast journalist, and was a presenter for ITV Yorkshire's Calendar, but is currently a reporter for Lookaround.

Based in Leeds, but originally from the Isle of Man, Walby was previously a reporter and presenter for the ITV Border regional news programme Lookaround. Whilst at Border, she covered the Carlisle floods of January 2005. Walby returned to Lookaround in late 2014.

From 2006 to 2014 Walby was a District Correspondent for the Leeds and West Yorkshire area and the main Friday female co-presenter of Calendar presenting alongside Duncan Wood, John Shires, Jon Hill and David Hirst, and was one of the faces of ITV Yorkshire.

References

Manx people
Living people
British reporters and correspondents
English television journalists
English women journalists
ITN newsreaders and journalists
ITV regional newsreaders and journalists
British television newsreaders and news presenters
British radio journalists
English radio presenters
British women television journalists
British women radio presenters
Year of birth missing (living people)